4 P.M. may refer to:

A time on the 12-hour clock
4 P.M. (group)
"4 P.M.", song from Stand Back! Here Comes Charley Musselwhite's Southside Band

See also
4 O'Clock
"Dallas 4pm", song by Tiesto

Date and time disambiguation pages